Ciocanu is a Romanian proper name. It can refer to:

Places
Ciocanu, a village in Dâmbovicioara Commune, Argeș County, Romania
Ciocanu Monastery, a monastery in Bughea de Jos Commune, Argeș County, Romania

People
Anatol Ciocanu (born 1940), Moldovan and Romanian poet and publicist
Ion Ciocanu (1940–2021), Moldovan and Romanian literary critic, philologist, pedagogue and writer
Vasile Ciocanu (1942–2003), Romanian literary historian and philologist

See also
Ciocan

Romanian-language surnames